Dorcadion punctipenne is a species of beetle in the family Cerambycidae. It was described by Küster in 1852. It is known from Turkey.

References

punctipenne
Beetles described in 1852